Hobergs is an unincorporated community in Lake County, California.
It grew up around the former Hoberg's Resort.

Description

Hobergs is a residential-resort community in the Cobb Mountain area.

The federal candidate endangered species Rincon Ridge ceanothus (Ceanothus confusus) is found at Hobergs.
The subdivision is served by the Middletown Unified School District, with grades K-6 attending Cobb Elementary School and higher grades attending schools in Middletown.
Hobergs has a small local commercial center.

History

Gustave Hoberg founded a resort at the site in 1885.  A post office operated at Hobergs from 1929 to 1970.

The community was devastated by the Valley Fire in September 2015.

References

Sources

Hotels in California
Resorts in Lake County, California